Harry Fechner (born 4 May 1950) is a retired German football defender. He is the father of fellow professional footballer Gino Fechner.

References

External links
 

1950 births
Living people
German footballers
Bundesliga players
2. Bundesliga players
VfL Bochum players
VfL Bochum II players
1. FC Saarbrücken players
Association football defenders